The 1972 NAIA World Series was the 16th annual tournament hosted by the National Association of Intercollegiate Athletics to determine the national champion of baseball among its member colleges and universities in the United States and Canada.

The tournament was played at Phoenix Municipal Stadium in Phoenix, Arizona.

La Verne (44-9) defeated David Lipscomb (35-9) in the first game of the championship series, 4–1, to win the Leopards' first NAIA World Series. La Verne finished the tournament undefeated, 5-0.

La Verne pitcher Ben Ochoa was named tournament MVP.

Bracket

See also
 1972 NCAA University Division baseball tournament
 1972 NCAA College Division baseball tournament

Reference

NAIA World Series
NAIA World Series
NAIA World Series